Umka is a suburban settlement of Belgrade, Serbia. It is located in the municipality of Čukarica.

Location 
It is a crossroads on the IB-26 highway, with roads connecting it with another important highway to the east, the Ibarska magistrala.

Administration 
Umka was a separate municipality, comprising surrounding villages of Rucka and Pećani which had a population 3,044 by the 1953 census. It was later enlarged with several surrounding villages, but the municipality was ultimately dissolved in 1960 and divided between Čukarica (Umka, Rucka and Pećani) and Barajevo (Meljak and Vranić).

Geography 
One of the characteristics of the Belgrade city terrain is mass wasting. On the territory covered by the General Urban Plan there are 1,155 recorded mass wasting points, out of which 602 are active and 248 are labeled as the "high risk". They cover almost 30% of the city territory. Downhill creeps are located on the slopes above the rivers, mostly on the clay or loam soils, inclined between 7 and 20 degrees and Umka, especially its neighborhood of Duboko, is one of the largest and most active. The creep stretches into the municipality of Obrenovac.

The settlement Duboko, on the creep, developed in the 1960s. It is unevenly constructed, with over 500 houses and other objects. Historically, the largest movements of the land occurred in 1914, 1941, 1978, 1982 and 2005.

The mass wasting causes the damages on the houses and the freeway which sink and get ruptured constantly. Damages are being repaired and patched but the massive project of stopping down the terrain is found to be too expensive. As the houses would lean on one side, the residents themselves were digging down the opposite side, leveling the objects. However, after the next massive rainy seasons, the process would continue. In the 1950s, the channels were dug for collecting the atmospheric precipitation from the slopes of the Lipik hill, conducting it down to the Obrenovac Road. There, several culverts were built below the road to conduct the water into the Sava. However, the system wasn't maintained and in time the mass wasting accelerated.

Several projects from the 1960s to the 1980s, aggravated the problem. The waterworks system was built, but not the sewage system. First major damages on the houses were recorded after the waterworks was finished. Downstream from Duboko, the Belgrade's water treatment facility was built in the 1980s, in Makiš, which also had a negative effect on the mass wasting. On its side closest to the river, the freeway is being patched every year, so the asphalt concrete is several meters thick in some sections.

It caused the problem for the route of the future A2 motorway, as the Belgrade City government planned to conduct the road on the left bank of the Sava, in the flat Syrmia region, bypassing the mass wasting area, while the government of Serbia pushed the right bank route. Ensuing debate became highly political and resulted in open clash between the Belgrade's mayor Nenad Bogdanović and Serbian minister for capital investments Velimir Ilić in 2006. In the end, in March 2017 the construction of the motorway through Syrmia began. The projected cost of repairing Duboko is over 30 million euros. The most likely process would be a massive filling up of the area with stone, which would shift the river current from the right side, where it erodes the creep, to the left, Syrmian side.

The municipality tried to relocate the population to Ostružnica, but the locality where the new settlement was to be built had numerous ownership problems, so the idea was dropped. In January 2020, the government declared public interest in this matter. Based on his, the expropriation of the privately owned parcels in Duboko began in January 2021, as the first phase of fixing the mass wasting problem. The project includes construction of the embankment in Duboko, fixing the mass wasting and regulation of the Sava's riverbed in this section.

Population 

Umka is classified as an urban settlement (town), but many published sources refer to it as varošica (small town) even though statistically there is no such classification. The settlement experienced high growth of population after World War II, but has stagnated in the last four decades. New tourist settlement (vikend naselje) is built on the bank of the Sava.  According to the 2011 census, the population of Umka was 5,272. Umka makes a continuous built-up urban area with the neighboring urban settlements of Pećani (pop. 562 in 2011) and Rucka (pop. 316).

Economy 
Umka was well known in former Yugoslavia for its two major factories: Zelengora, the knitted goods manufacturer and general representative for the Speedo swimsuits, and Umka cardboard factory. Both factories followed the destiny of other companies during the economic collapse in the 1990s. Umka also has an advanced agricultural farm.

In 1928, a railway tunnel was dug at Umka. It was part of the Belgrade-Dubrovnik narrow gauge railway. As of 2018, the entrance into the tunnel is accessible.

Notable people
 Milan Gutović, actor

References

External links 

Neighborhoods of Belgrade
Čukarica